Geodermatophilus africanus is a Gram-positive, aerobic and halotolerant bacterium from the genus Geodermatophilus which has been isolated from desert sand near Ourba in the Sahara.

References

Bacteria described in 2013
Actinomycetia